Bashmaq may refer to:
 Bashmaq, Hashtrud, East Azerbaijan Province
 Bashmaq, Meyaneh, East Azerbaijan Province
 Bashmaq, Dehgolan, Kurdistan Province
 Bashmaq, Marivan, Kurdistan Province
 Bashmaq, Saqqez, Kurdistan Province